Sarvabad is a city in Kurdistan Province, Iran.

Sarvabad may also refer to:
 Sarvabad, Razavi Khorasan
 Sarvabad, South Khorasan
 Sarvabad County, in Kurdistan Province